"Shine On" is a song by American house music project Degrees of Motion, featuring vocals by Biti Strauchn and Kit West. It was originally released in July 1992 as a single from their album, Degrees Of Motion (1991), peaking at number 43 on the UK Singles Chart. Following a re-release in March 1994, it charted higher, peaking at number eight on the same listing. It also reached number one on the UK Dance Singles Chart same year. A music video was produced to promote the single.

Critical reception
Larry Flick from Billboard described the song as "a rousing, gospel-flavored pop/houser. Anthemic chorus is empowered by Biti's inspiring lead vocal and a rush of choral chants. Fast picking up club adds, this contagious ditty is a worthy addition to pop and urban radio formats." Maria Jimenez from Music & Media viewed it as "outstanding", adding that it "rides high on a positive tip charged by an up-tempo house beat." James Hamilton from Music Weeks RM Dance Update called it a "frisky" and "striking Biti wailed snappy disco-garage canterer". Another editor, Andy Beevers, declared it as an "excellent garage song". Pete Stanton from Smash Hits praised the track, giving it four out of five. He wrote, "Little is known about Degrees Of Motion. There's four of them and they've got names like ice-cream flavours — Biti, Kit, Bali and Mariposa. "Shine On" was released last year to nil effect. And that's a crime! This is fabulous dance track sort of thing that makes your arms wave around in the air like you just don't... oh, you know the rest. Come on Mr Charts — let this record into your house."

Track listings
 12-inch, US (1992) "Shine On" (club mix) — 8:25
 "Shine On" (trance dub) — 4:05
 "Shine On" (extended album mix) — 7:07
 "Shine On" (Inspiration mix) — 5:00
 "Shine On" (Bonus Chant) — 1:38

 CD single, UK and Europe (1992) "Shine On" (7-inch) — 4:01
 "Shine On" (extended LP mix) — 7:11
 "Shine On" (Inspiration mix) — 5:02
 "Shine On" (Junior Style dub) — 7:27

 CD single, UK and Europe (1994)'
 "Shine On" (Radiant edit) — 4:07
 "Shine On" (Radiant remix) — 8:16
 "Shine On" (original extended LP mix) — 7:10
 "Shine On" (Inspiration mix) — 5:04
 "Shine On" (Junior Style dub) — 7:25

Charts

Release history

References

1992 singles
1992 songs
1994 songs
American house music songs
Electro songs
FFRR Records singles
House music songs
Music Week number-one dance singles